FS, fS or fs may refer to:

Arts and entertainment
 FS (musician) (real name Fred Sargolini), American dubstep producer and DJ from New York
 FS Catalogue, a numbered list of all compositions by Carl Nielsen
 FS Film, a Finnish film distributor
Flight simulator, a professional simulator of planes
Amateur flight simulation, a video game version of simulators
Microsoft Flight Simulator, an amateur flight simulator series
Microsoft Flight Simulator X, the 2006 edition, commonly referred to as FSX
Microsoft Flight Simulator (2020 video game), the 2020 edition, commonly referred to as FS

Businesses and organizations

In transportation
 Ferrocarril de Sóller, a railway on Majorca
 Ferrovie dello Stato, Italian state railways
 First ScotRail, a British rail train operator
 ItAli Airlines (IATA airline designator FS)
 FS Trenitalia Italian railway company

Other businesses and organizations
 Frankfurt School of Finance & Management, a Business School in Frankfurt, Germany
 FS Investments, a fund management firm based in Philadelphia, Pennsylvania.
 FS Services, now Growmark, an agricultural supply cooperative
 Full Sail Real World Education, a university in Florida dedicated to real world education in the entertainment industry
 Future Shop, a defunct Canadian consumer electronics retailer

Mathematics, science, and technology

Computing
 FS register, in X86fs computer architecture
 File Separator, a character in the C0 and C1 control codes
 File server, a form of disk storage
 File system, in computer science and database theory
 Flipnote Studio, a DSi animation software
 Forward secrecy, a property of cryptographic systems
 Fullscreen, a picture format in 4:3 aspect ratio, as opposed to widescreen
 IBM Future Systems project a failed IBM project to develop a computer line to replace System/360
 Feature structure, a set of attribute–value pairs

Health and medicine
 Felty's syndrome, autoimmune disease, with rheumatoid arthritis, enlargement of the spleen and too few neutrophils in the blood
 Fibrin sealant, a type of surgical tissue adhesive used during surgery to control bleeding
 Flight Surgeon, a physician who is responsible for the medical evaluation, certification and treatment of aviation personnel
 Fractional shortening of the heart
 Formularium Slovenicum, Slovenian addendum to the European Pharmacopoeia

Mathematics
 Fourier series, a mathematical tool used for analyzing periodic functions
 Sampling rate (symbol ), in communications theory

Other uses in science and technology
 Feldspar, a group of silicate minerals
 Femtosecond, an SI unit of time
 Femtosiemens, an SI unit of electric conductance
 Fin-stabilized projectile, such as the APFSDS or HEAT-FS
 Fine structure, in atomic physics
 Flank speed, a ship's true maximum speed
 Flight Simulator, a machine that tries to replicate the experience of flying
 Formula Student, a student engineering competition held annually in the UK
 Frameshift mutation, a genetic mutation
 Fujita scale (F-Scale), or Fujita-Pearson scale, a scale for rating tornado intensity
 Full scale, in electronics and signal processing, the maximum amplitude a system can present
 Marine flooding surface, a sharp contact between deep-water and shallow-water facies in sequence stratigraphy

Military
 Fire Support, artillery or close air support for combat operations
 Flight Sergeant, a non-commissioned officer in some air forces
 Flight Surgeon, physician primarily responsible for the medical evaluation, certification and treatment of aviation personnel
 French Ship, a NATO prefix for ships of the French Navy

Sport
 Fox Sports (United States)
 FS1, Fox Sports 1
 FS2, Fox Sports 2
 Free safety, one variation of the defensive back position in American football
 Free skating, the second part of a figure skating competition

Other uses
 Federal Standard 595, a United States federal standard defining color shades
 Financial Secretary (Hong Kong)
 For Sale (disambiguation)
 Foundation Stage, term used for early childhood education in the United Kingdom
 Franco's Spain, Spain under the leadership of Francisco Franco
 French Southern Territories (FIPS PUB 10-4 territory code); excludes the Terre Adélie portion of Antarctica
 Full service (disambiguation)